Dr. Floyd B. Buchanan High School, known as Buchanan High School, is a four-year public high school in Clovis, California, United States. The school is part of the Buchanan Educational Center, which houses approximately 5,000 students at Garfield Elementary School (K-6), Alta Sierra Intermediate School (7-8), and Buchanan High School. The school graduated its first class in the spring of 1995, and is named after CUSD's first district superintendent, Dr. Floyd B. Buchanan, which makes Buchanan High School the only CUSD high school that does not contain "Clovis" in its name.

Academics
Buchanan High School fields academic teams in Science Olympiad, FRC Robotics, Mock Trial, Academic Decathlon, Science Bowl, and Forensics. The high school offers fifteen AP classes as well as six honors classes, two comprehensive four-year foreign language programs, and a variety of performing and visual arts classes including drama, photography, ceramics, art, videography, choir, orchestra, color guard, and band among others. Additionally, students have the option of, as a Junior or Senior, taking vocationally-oriented courses through the Regional Occupational Training program or CART high school.

Honors classes:

AP Classes:

Facilities

The school has the largest campus in CUSD.

Years after the Track & Field/Football Stadium opened for use, it was renamed Veterans Memorial Stadium after the numerous Buchanan Students that have died in the Iraq & Afghanistan wars.

Test scores and honors
The school is a National Blue Ribbon School and a California Distinguished School. In 2022 according to U.S. News & World Report Buchan High School was ranked as the 241st best high school in the state and the 4th best in Fresno County.

Athletics
Buchanan was awarded "California Athletic High School of the Year" in 05–06. The Bears received "Special Mention State School of the Year" by CalHiSports for their athletic success in 07-08 and 08- 09.
The Bears wrestling team was State Champions in the 2005–2006 season. The Bears Baseball Team was awarded the Powerade Fab50 National Champions title for the 2010–2011 season. The Men's Volleyball team were Maxpreps Top-Ranked team in CA in 2011.

Varsity Athletics

Boys

Fall: Football, Water Polo, Cross Country
Winter: Soccer, Basketball, Wrestling
Spring: Baseball, Tennis, Swimming and Diving, Track and Field, Volleyball

Girls

Fall: Gymnastics, Water Polo, Tennis, Cross Country, Volleyball, Golf
Winter: Soccer, Basketball
Spring: Badminton, Track and Field, Softball, Swimming and Diving

Activities
The marching band has won awards and trophies in the Western Band Association and Northern California Band Association.
Under the direction of Key Poulan, both concert wind ensembles were selected to perform at Carnegie Hall in New York City, April 14, 2001.

The jazz band has produced several recordings, and has gone to the Monterey Next-Generation Jazz Festival in 2007, 2008, 2009, 2010, 2011, 2012, 2013, and in 2014 of which they placed 2nd in the nation. They have also performed at the Monterey Jazz Festival in 2007, 2008, and 2014.

In May 2006, all four choir groups won 1st Gold at the spring festival and were given the prestigious Sweepstakes Award, earning the title of best high school choir on the entire West Coast that year. Similarly, in 2008 the groups placed 1st and 2nd and were duly noted for their outstanding work.

In 2015, the school's robotics team, along with 3 other high school teams from around the country, won the FIRST Robotics Competition Championship in St. Louis, making them world champions.

The school also has an award-winning National History Day team and a nationally ranked pep & cheer program.

Buchanan High School is also known for its nationally recognized Space Mission simulation, titled Columbia Space. This program was started to expose students to the wonders of space, as well as to honor the crew members on the Space Shuttle Columbia. In the program, students create an entire mission, from planning experiments to training and selecting astronauts, by themselves. The Columbia Space Mission had a downlink with the International Space Station with Astronaut Greg Chamitoff.
Buchanan High school won the national, state and valley championships for baseball in 2011.

Other distinctions
As of December 2010, eight Buchanan HS alumni have died in the wars in Iraq and Afghanistan, more than from any other California high school.

Student body

Notable alumni

Kyle Alcorn, 2012 Olympian in the steeplechase
Kevin Chappell, 2008 NCAA individual and team golf champion (UCLA), Jack Nicklaus Award winner, 2010 Fresh Express Classic at TPC Stonebrae Winner (Nationwide Tour), professional golfer
Jason Donald, member of 2008 USA Baseball Team at 2008 Beijing Olympics, professional baseball player for Cleveland Indians
Jordan Feliz, Christian musician
Matt Giordano, professional football player for Oakland Raiders and Super Bowl XLI champion Indianapolis Colts
Ryan Kenny, professional soccer player
Jordan Luplow, MLB outfielder, Pittsburgh Pirates, Cleveland Indians, Tampa Bay Rays, Arizona Diamondbacks
Rick Merlo, member of 2008 USA Water Polo Team at 2008 Beijing Olympics
Kendall Milton, college football running back, Georgia Bulldogs
D. J. Mitchell, professional basketball player
Garrett Olson, MLB pitcher, Baltimore Orioles, Seattle Mariners, Pittsburgh Pirates
Nathan Smith, professional soccer player, LA Galaxy
Justin Wilson, Major League Baseball pitcher, Pittsburgh Pirates, Detroit Tigers, Chicago Cubs
Jessica Wittner,  Astronaut and Lieutenant Commander in the United States Navy

References

External links
 Official website

Educational institutions established in 1991
High schools in Fresno County, California
Clovis, California
Public high schools in California
1991 establishments in California